Christopher O'Sullivan (born 2 June 1982) is an Irish Fianna Fáil politician who has been a Teachta Dála (TD) for the Cork South-West constituency since the 2020 general election.

Early and personal life
O'Sullivan is a law graduate of the University of Limerick. His father, Christy O'Sullivan, served as a Fianna Fáil TD from 2007 to 2011.

Political career

Cork County Council
O'Sullivan was co-opted onto Cork County Council in 2007, replacing his father, Christy O'Sullivan. He was subsequently re-elected in the 2009, 2014 and 2019 local elections. He served as Mayor of Cork County Council from 2019 to 2020. Deirdre Kelly was co-opted to O'Sullivan's seat on Cork County Council following his election to the Dáil.

Dáil Éireann
O'Sullivan was elected to the 33rd Dail at the 2020 general election, taking the second seat in the Cork South-West constituency. He received 6,292 first preference votes, taking 14.12% of first presences votes overall.

See also 
 Families in the Oireachtas

References

External links
Christopher O'Sullivan's page on the Fianna Fáil website

Living people
1982 births
Local councillors in County Cork
Members of the 33rd Dáil
Politicians from County Cork
Fianna Fáil TDs